Alexander Slight (13 April 1861 – 5 July 1930) was an Australian cricketer. He played in one first-class match for South Australia in 1886/87.

See also
 List of South Australian representative cricketers

References

External links
 

1861 births
1930 deaths
Australian cricketers
South Australia cricketers
Cricketers from Melbourne